AKM Musa is a Bangladeshi retired career bureaucrat and former adviser, with the rank of minister, of Shahabuddin Ahmed caretaker government. He served as the Ministry of Industry and the Ministry of Textiles and Jute.

References

Living people
Advisors of Caretaker Government of Bangladesh
Year of birth missing (living people)